The following outline is provided as an overview of and topical guide to the  aerospace field:

Aerospace  – comprises the atmosphere of Earth and surrounding space.  Typically the term is used to refer to the aerospace industry, which researches, designs, manufactures, operates, and maintains vehicles moving through air and space.  The aerospace field is diverse, with a multitude of commercial, industrial, and military applications.

Essence of aerospace

Aerospace
 Aircraft
 Atmosphere
 Geocentric orbit
 Space
 Spacecraft

Aerospace industries and applications
 Air transport
 Aerospace manufacturing
 Space exploration

Subdisciplines of the aerospace field
 General aviation
 Aeronautics
 Astronautics
 Aerospace engineering

Aerospace organizations

Space agencies
 NASA
 ESA
 Canadian Space Agency
 Indian Space Research Organization
 Russian Federal Space Agency (RKA)
 China National Space Administration
 Iranian Space Agency
 German Aerospace Center
 United Kingdom Space Agency

Aerospace companies

Aerospace manufacturers
 Airbus
 Boeing
 Bombardier Aerospace
 Embraer
 Lockheed Martin
 Northrop Grumman
 Air transport companies
 Lists of airlines

Aerospace schools
 List of aerospace engineering schools

History of aerospace

History of aerospace
 Timeline of aviation
 Timeline of space exploration
 Discovery and exploration of the Solar System
 Timeline of Solar System exploration
 Wright brothers, Kittyhawk, Wright Glider
 Vergeltungswaffe
 V-1 flying bomb
 V-2 rocket
 List of V-2 test launches
 List of V-2 launches in the United States
 Project Vanguard
 Sputnik, Sputnik crisis
 Space race
 Operation Paperclip
 List of communications satellite firsts
 Apollo program
 List of Proton launches
 List of Thor and Delta launches
 List of R-7 launches
 List of Falcon 1 launches
 List of NRO Launches
 List of Atlas launches
 List of Long March launches
 List of Black Brant launches
 List of Titan launches
 List of Ariane launches
 List of GPS satellite launches
 Skylab
 History of the International Space Station
 Origins of the International Space Station
 Assembly of the International Space Station
 List of ISS spacewalks
 List of spacewalks and moonwalks
 List of cumulative spacewalk records

Future of aerospace

United States

Vision for Space Exploration
 Develop Shuttle-Derived Launch Vehicles
 Explore the Moon with robotic spacecraft missions by 2008 and crewed missions by 2020
 Transiting Exoplanet Survey Satellite (planned launch for 2018)
 Explore Mars and other destinations with robotic and crewed missions
 Psyche (spacecraft) (planned for 2022)

General aerospace concepts
 Aerospace architecture
 Aerospace physiology
 Aircraft
 Atmospheric reentry
 Aviation
 Space program
 Satellites
 Spacecraft
 SpaceShipOne
 Wind tunnel
 List of orbital launch systems

Persons influential in aerospace

 Elon Musk
 Burt Rutan
 more...

See also

 Index of aerospace engineering articles

External links

 National Aeronautics and Space Administration (NASA) - U.S.
 European Space Agency (ESA) — E.U.
 Japan Aerospace Exploration Agency (JAXA) — Japan
BLS website on aerospace industry
Aerospace Industries Association
American Institute of Aeronautics and Astronautics
Federal Aviation Administration
 Iranian Aerospace Industries Organization
 Ioonos : Space in Europe
 Machine Tool Manufacturers´ of Spain (AFM) for aerospace industry

Aerospace
Aerospace
Spaceflight
List of basic aerospace topics